Jouni Mykkänen (born 6 October 1939 in Helsinki) is a Finnish journalist and politician. He was a member of the Parliament of Finland from 1970 to 1974, representing the National Coalition Party.

References

1939 births
Living people
Politicians from Helsinki
Finnish Lutherans
National Coalition Party politicians
Members of the Parliament of Finland (1970–72)
Members of the Parliament of Finland (1972–75)
University of Helsinki alumni